São João is a city located in the state of Pernambuco, Brazil. Located  at 240 km away from Recife, capital of the state of Pernambuco. Has an estimated (IBGE 2020) population of 22,899 inhabitants.

Geography
 State - Pernambuco
 Region - Agreste Pernambucano
 Boundaries - Jupi and Jucati   (N);  Palmeirina    (S);  Angelim   (E);   Garanhuns    (W).
 Area - 244.44 km2
 Elevation - 716 m
 Hydrography - Mundaú River
 Vegetation - Caatinga Hiperxerófila
 Climate - Tropical hot and humid
 Annual average temperature - 21.4 c
 Distance to Recife - 240 km

Economy
The main economic activities in São João are based in agribusiness, especially  beans, manioc; and livestock such as cattle, sheep and chickens.

Economic indicators

Economy by Sector
2006

Health indicators

References

Municipalities in Pernambuco